Ålgård is a village in Gjesdal municipality in Rogaland county, Norway.

Ålgård or Aalgaard may also refer to:

Places
Ålgård Church, a church in Gjesdal municipality in Rogaland county, Norway
Old Ålgård Church, a church in Gjesdal municipality in Rogaland county, Norway

People with the surname
Gabriel Ålgård (1952–2015), Norwegian politician for the Conservative Party
Gabriel Aalgaard (1881–1973), Norwegian agriculturalist and politician
Ole Ålgård (1921–1995), Norwegian diplomat to China and the United Nations

Other
Ålgård FK, a Norwegian football club located in Ålgård
Ålgård Line, a closed, but not abandoned, railway line between Ganddal and Ålgård in Norway